Hassi Mounir (also known as Hassi El Mounir) is a village in the commune of Oum El Assel, in Tindouf Province, Algeria. It is connected to the N50 national highway by a long local road leading southwest of the village. The village is the site of a project to introduce solar energy to Algeria, with 42 households connected to 6 solar power systems.

References

Neighbouring towns and cities

Populated places in Tindouf Province